The 2003–04 Allsvenskan season was the fifth season of the Allsvenskan, the second level of ice hockey in Sweden. 24 teams participated in the league, and Mora IK, Hammarby IF, AIK, and Skellefteå AIK qualified for the Kvalserien.

Regular season

Northern Group

Southern Group

SuperAllsvenskan

Qualification round

Northern Group

Southern Group

Playoffs

First round 
 Nybro IF - Bofors IK 0:2 (3:4 OT., 2:5)
 Nyköpings Hockey - AIK 0:2 (0:6, 1:2 OT)
 Växjö Lakers - IF Sundsvall Hockey 2:0 (2:1, 4:3 OT)
 Piteå HC - Skellefteå AIK 1:2 (2:1 OT, 1:5, 1:4)

Second round 
 Bofors IK - AIK 1:2 (2:1, 2:4, 1:3)
 Växjö Lakers - Skellefteå AIK 1:2 (2:1 OT, 2:3 OT, 1:5)

Relegation round

Northern Group 

Vallentuna BK did not participate in the relegation round and were relegated to Division 1.

Southern Group

Kvalserien

External links 
 Season on passionhockey.com

Swe
HockeyAllsvenskan seasons
2